Youngblood is an album by trumpeter Jon Faddis recorded in 1976 and released by the Pablo label.

Reception

AllMusic reviewer Scott Yanow stated "Jon Faddis burst onto the jazz scene at an early age, recording a brilliant duo album with pianist Oscar Peterson and this quartet date before disappearing into the studios for a few years. Twenty-two at the time, Faddis (heavily influenced by Dizzy Gillespie but possessing a superior high-note technique) holds his own".

Track listing
 "Here 'Tis" (Dizzy Gillespie) – 9:55
 "Gershwin Prelude #2" (George Gershwin) – 9:28
 "Round Midnight" (Thelonious Monk, Cootie Williams, Bernie Hanighen) – 11:20
 "Be Bop (Dizzy'z Fingers)" (Gillespie) – 6:11
 "Samba de Orpheus (Carnival)" (Luiz Bonfá, Antônio Maria) – 6:18

Personnel 
Jon Faddis – trumpet
Kenny Barron – piano
George Mraz – bass
Mickey Roker – drums

References 

1976 albums
Jon Faddis albums
Pablo Records albums
Albums produced by Norman Granz